Joel Ross is an American former professional tennis player. His peak rank was #288, in December 1976.  Ross was Big Ten singles champion in 1971, and at the 1977 Maccabiah Games in Israel he won the men's doubles gold medal.

Biography
A native of Westbury, New York, he attended Westbury High School.  Ross played collegiate tennis for the University of Michigan, was captain of the tennis team, and was Big Ten singles champion in 1971. 

His Grand Prix appearances included a loss to Guillermo Vilas at the 1976 Stockholm Open, where he took the Argentine to a first set tiebreak. He featured in the men's doubles main draw of the 1977 US Open.

At the 1977 Maccabiah Games in Israel, in which he was player-coach for the Team USA tennis squad, he and partner Peter Rennert, who was later world #8 in doubles, won the men's doubles gold medal.

References

External links
 
 

Year of birth missing (living people)
Living people
American male tennis players
Jewish American sportspeople
Jewish tennis players
Maccabiah Games medalists in tennis
Maccabiah Games gold medalists for the United States
Competitors at the 1977 Maccabiah Games
Michigan Wolverines men's tennis players
Tennis people from New York (state)
People from Westbury, New York